Castleden is a surname. Notable people with the name include:

 George Hugh Castleden (1895–1969), Canadian politician
 Heather Castleden (born 1970), Canadian geographer